Ákos Molnár (born 22 July 1987 in Szeged) is a Hungarian swimmer. At the 2012 Summer Olympics, he competed in the Men's 200 metre breaststroke, finishing in 20th place overall in the heats, failing to qualify for the semifinals.

References

External links
 

Hungarian male swimmers
1991 births
Living people
Olympic swimmers of Hungary
Swimmers at the 2012 Summer Olympics
Male breaststroke swimmers
People from Szeged